Amateur Crook is a 1937 American romantic comedy film directed by Sam Katzman.

The film is also known as Crooked But Dumb (in the United Kingdom) and Jewel Thief (American TV title).

Plot 
Joan Barclay as Betsy Cummings takes a job as a secretary, using the alias “Mary Layton”, only to find that her Father (Forrest Taylor as Jerry Cummings) is being cheated by his brokers, Monte Blue as Crone and Jack Mulhall as Jan Jaffin.

She steals the diamond, worth fifty thousand dollars, her Father used as collateral for a loan, which the brokers plan to cheat him out of; and, the chase is on, with the crooked loan sharks and police after her.

Bruce Bennett (Billed as Herman Brix, one of the movie serials “Tarzans”) as Jimmy Baxter, an honest but broke artist, hides her as a mannequin, and helps her get away, in a stolen car.

They just have to keep ahead of everyone after them, until her Father can get back, if he can get back, with the brokers’ crooked henchmen trying to stop him.

Out of luck and almost out of time, they all end up in front of a Justice of the Peace, who tries to fathom out the facts, and whether to jail the pair or marry them, before his dinner gets cold.

Cast 
Bruce Bennett as Jimmy Baxter
Joan Barclay as Betsy Cummings, alias Mary Layton
Monte Blue as Crone
Jack Mulhall as Jan Jaffin
Vivien Oakland as Mrs. Flint, Landlady
Jimmy Aubrey as Ben Armand, Junk Dealer
Fuzzy Knight as Jape, the Gas-Station Attendant
Henry Roquemore as Judge Ephraim
Edward Earle as Deputy Jonas
Forrest Taylor as Jerry Cummings
Fern Emmett as Sarah, Ephraim's Wife
Sam Adams as Policeman
Charles Williams as Drunk Witness

External links 

1937 films
American romantic comedy films
American crime comedy films
American black-and-white films
Films directed by Sam Katzman
1937 romantic comedy films
1930s crime comedy films
Victory Pictures films
1930s English-language films
1930s American films